Tour of Danger is a Nancy Drew and Hardy Boys Supermystery novel. It was published in 1992.

Plot summary
Nancy Drew is on a fourteen-day tour of Japan, working on the case of an elderly woman accused of smuggling rare pearls in her souvenir vase. Convinced she is innocent, Nancy uncovers a far-fetched plot and a secret conspiracy. Frank and Joe are in Japan too, at Amsa Incorporated, investigating on behalf of a high-tech firm whose product lines have been stolen and shipped to the U.S. under the Amsa logo. Having established a connection, the teen detectives join forces to solve their cases together.

Adaptation 
The 23rd installment in the Nancy Drew point-and-click adventure game series by Her Interactive, named Nancy Drew: Shadow at the Water's Edge, is loosely based on the novel and also incorporate elements from The Thirteenth Pearl.

References

External links
Tour of Danger at Fantastic Fiction
Supermystery series books

Supermystery
1992 American novels
1992 children's books
Novels set in Japan
Novels adapted into video games
Japan in non-Japanese culture